The Japanese Concerts is a live album by jazz saxophonist Cannonball Adderley recorded at the Kōsei Nenkin Kaikan and Sankei Hall in Tokyo during his 1963 Japanese tour and featuring performances by Adderley with Nat Adderley, Yusef Lateef, Joe Zawinul, Sam Jones and Louis Hayes. The album was released on the Milestone label in 1975 and combines material previously released on Adderley's Nippon Soul (1963) with an additional disc of unreleased performances from a concert recorded a week earlier.

Reception
The Allmusic review by Scott Yanow awarded the album 4½ stars and states "Cannonball Adderley's finest group is heard at the peak of their powers on this two-LP set... these musicians were very familiar with each other's playing and they had grown together. The enthusiastic Japanese crowds inspired the all-star band to some of their most rewarding playing... It's a definitive portrait of a classic group".

Track listing
Side One:
 "Nippon Soul (Nihon No Soul)" (Julian "Cannonball" Adderley) - 9:34  
 "Easy to Love" (Cole Porter) - 3:49  
 "The Weaver" (Yusef Lateef) - 10:50 
Side Two: 
 "Tengo Tango" (Julian "Cannonball" Adderley, Nat Adderley) - 2:40  
 "Come Sunday" (Duke Ellington) - 7:03  
 "Brother John" (Lateef) - 13:03  
Side Three:
 'Work Song" (Nat Adderley) - 9:06 
 "Autumn Leaves" (Joseph Kosma, Jacques Prévert) - 7:27
 "Dizzy's Business" (Ernie Wilkins) - 6:01
Side Four:
 "Primitivo" (J. Adderley) - 12:12
 "Jive Samba" (N. Adderley) - 10:37
Recorded at Koseinenkin Kaikan in Tokyo, Japan on July 9 (Sides Three, tracks 1 & 3 and Side Four, track 2), and Sankei Hall in Tokyo, Japan on July 14 (Side One, tracks 2 & 3 and Side Three, track 2) and 15 (Side One track 1 and Side Two and Side Four, track 2), 1963

Personnel
Cannonball Adderley - alto saxophone
Nat Adderley - cornet
Yusef Lateef - tenor saxophone, flute, oboe
Joe Zawinul - piano
Sam Jones - bass
Louis Hayes - drums

References

1975 live albums
1975 compilation albums
Cannonball Adderley compilation albums
Cannonball Adderley live albums
Milestone Records compilation albums
Milestone Records live albums